LSD March is a Japanese psychedelic rock group, hailing from the city of Himeji, led by singer and guitarist Shinsuke Michishita. The group is named after a track by krautrock group Guru Guru. Michishita has also played with Magura Mozart and Doodles.

In 2009, Michishita began the psych-folk group, Kasumi Trio. The other members are Ikuro Takahashi (from Fushitsusha, Nagisa ni te) and Takashi Ueno.

Selected discography

Albums
 1997-2001 at Mushroom CD (Gyuune Cassette, 2002) 
 Totsuzen honno no gotoku (突然炎のごとく) LP, (White Elephant, 2002; CD reissue, Last Visible Dog, 2004)
 Kanashimino bishonen LP (HP Cycle, 2004)
 Shindara jigoku LP (Siwa, 2004)
 LSD March Live CD (Archive, 2006)
 Empty Rubious Red CD (White Elephant; reissue, Archive 2006 CD, Tequila Sunrise 2007 LP)
 Tour CDr (White Elephant 2007)
 Constellation Of Tragedy CD (Important Records, 2007)
 Nikutai No Tubomi 2CD (Beta-lactam Ring Records, 2007)
 Under Milk Wood CD (Important Records, 2009)
 Uretakumo Nakunarutorika (Beta-lactam Ring Records, 2009)
 Untitled Split-LP with Mama Baer (DVR-HGA, 2012)

Compilations
 Mushroom A Go Go CD (Gyuune Cassette, 1998)
 The Night Gallery CD (Alchemy Records, 2003)
 Million Tongues Festival CD (Bastet, 2004)
 Catch 35 CD (Gyuune Cassette, 2004)

References

External links
LSD March on myspace
Dusted magazine review of Totsuzen honno no gotoku

Japanese rock music groups
Musical groups from Hyōgo Prefecture